Cao Phong is a rural district of Hòa Bình province in the Northwest region of Vietnam. As of 2020 the district had a population of 45,470. The district covers an area of 254 km². The district capital lies at Cao Phong.

References

Districts of Hòa Bình province
Hòa Bình province